is a former Japanese football player. She played for Japan national team.

Club career
Sugawara played for Iga FC Kunoichi.

National team career
On May 17, 1998, Sugawara debuted for Japan national team against United States. She played at 1998 Asian Games. She played 7 games and scored 2 goals for Japan in 1998.

National team statistics

References

Year of birth missing (living people)
Living people
Japanese women's footballers
Japan women's international footballers
Nadeshiko League players
Iga FC Kunoichi players
Asian Games bronze medalists for Japan
Asian Games medalists in football
Women's association football midfielders
Footballers at the 1998 Asian Games
Medalists at the 1998 Asian Games